DYS may relate to the following:

DYS (band)
Dys, Poland
the 3-letter abbreviation for Dystos, a Greek municipality